The CAB500 was a French transistor-based drum computer, designed at SEA around 1957 by Alice Recoque.

The computer had an incremental compiler for a language, PAF (Programmation Automatique des Formules) similar to Fortran, designed by Dimitri Starynkevitch in 1957-1959. CAB 500's first model was delivered in February, 1961, and more than a hundred exemplars were built.

References 

Transistorized computers